Denmark was represented by Anders Frandsen, with the song "Lige der hvor hjertet slår", at the 1991 Eurovision Song Contest, which took place on 4 May in Rome. "Lige der hvor hjertet slår" was chosen as the Danish entry at the Dansk Melodi Grand Prix on 16 March.

Before Eurovision

Dansk Melodi Grand Prix 1991 
The final was held at the Music Hall in Aarhus, hosted by Camilla Miehe-Renard and Mek Pek. Ten songs took part with the winner being decided by two rounds of televoting. In the first round the bottom five songs were eliminated, then the remaining five were voted on again to give the winner. One of the other participants was Birthe Kjær, who had finished third at Eurovision in 1989.

At Eurovision 
On the night of the final Frandsen performed 13th in the running order, following Portugal and preceding Norway. Performed by Frandsen seated at a piano, the song was very different in style from the uptempo hook-laden pop offerings which had become something of a Danish trademark since their return from hiatus in 1978. It appeared however that "Lige der hvor hjertet slår" lacked the instant appeal of songs such as those which had brought Denmark five consecutive top 10 finishes between 1986 and 1990, as at the close of voting the song had received only 8 points, placing Denmark 19th of the 22 entries, to that date the country's worst Eurovision placement. The Danish jury awarded its 12 points to contest winners Sweden.

Voting

References 

1991
Countries in the Eurovision Song Contest 1991
Eurovision